Jeff Sessions (born 1946) was a U.S. Senator from Alabama from 1997 to 2017.

Senator Sessions may also refer to:

David Sessions (fl. 2010s), Alabama State Senate
Kathryn Sessions (born 1942), Wyoming State Senate
Loren B. Sessions (1827–1897), New York State Senate
Milan H. Sessions (1821–1898), Wisconsin State Senate
Walter L. Sessions (1820–1896), New York State Senate